Robert Marvin Shelton (June 12, 1929 – March 17, 2003) was a former car-tire salesman and printer who became nationally famous as the Imperial Wizard of United Klans of America (UKA), a Ku Klux Klan group.

Career and KKK activities
Shelton was a factory worker and a car-tire salesman. He also owned a printing business, with an office on Union Boulevard. In the late 1960s, Shelton ran for Police Commissioner in Tuscaloosa, Alabama.  He finished in fifth place.

Following the death of Imperial Wizard Eldon Edwards, the original KKK organization began to fracture during the leadership of Imperial Wizard Roy Davis during the 1960s. Shelton started a new KKK organization, the United Klans of America in an effort to unite the various KKK factions, and served as the UKA leader starting in 1961. which peaked with an estimated 30,000 members. By 1965, Shelton's organization had outgrown the other KKK factions to become the largest in the United States, according to the FBI.  In 1966 Shelton received a year in prison and $1,000 fine for contempt of the United States Congress, "for refusing to turn over membership lists to the House Committee on Un-American Activities."

In 1984, James Knowles, a UKA member of the UKA's Klavern 900 in Mobile, was convicted of the 1981 murder of Michael Donald. At trial Knowles said he and Henry Hays killed Donald "in order to show Klan strength in Alabama." In 1987, the Southern Poverty Law Center (SPLC) brought a civil case, on behalf of the victim's family, against the United Klans of America for being responsible in the lynching of Donald, a 19-year-old black man. Unable to come up with the $7 million awarded by a jury, the UKA was forced to turn over its national headquarters to Donald's mother, who then sold it. During the civil trial Knowles said he was "carrying out the orders" of Bennie Jack Hays, Henry Hays' father and a long-time Shelton lieutenant.

In 1994, Shelton said, "The Klan is my belief, my religion. But it won't work anymore. The Klan is gone. Forever."

Death
Shelton died of a heart attack on March 17, 2003, in Tuscaloosa, Alabama.

References

External links

 United Klans of America History
 Endnotes: Robert Shelton Biography
 Photos of Robert Shelton from the Moncrief Photograph Collection at the Mississippi Archives 

1929 births
2003 deaths
People from Tuscaloosa, Alabama
Leaders of the Ku Klux Klan
Activists from Alabama
American Ku Klux Klan members